Russia can be divided into a European and an Asian part. The dividing line is generally considered to be the Ural Mountains. The European part is drained into the Arctic Ocean, Baltic Sea, Black Sea, and Caspian Sea. The Asian part is drained into the Arctic Ocean and the Pacific Ocean.

Notable rivers of Russia in Europe are Volga (which is the longest river in Europe), Pechora, Don, Kama, Oka and the Northern Dvina, while several other rivers originate in Russia but flow into other countries, such as the Dnieper and the Western Dvina.

In Asia, important rivers are the Ob, the Irtysh, the Yenisei, the Angara, the Lena, the Amur, the Yana, the Indigirka, and the Kolyma.

In the list below, the rivers are grouped by the seas or oceans into which they flow. Rivers that flow into other rivers are ordered by the proximity of their point of confluence to the mouth of the main river, i.e., the lower in the list, the more upstream.

There is an alphabetical list of rivers at the end of this article.

Barents Sea and White Sea (Arctic Ocean)
The rivers in this section are sorted east to west.
Pechora (north-east of Naryan-Mar)
Usa (west of Usinsk)
Kolva (near Usinsk)
Bolshaya Synya
Northern Dvina (in Severodvinsk)
Pinega (in Ust-Pinega)
Yomtsa (near Bolshaya Gora)
Vaga (near Bereznik)
Uftyuga (near Krasnoborsk)
Vychegda (in Kotlas)
Vishera
Yug (in Veliki Ustyug)
Sukhona (in Veliki Ustyug)
Vologda (near Vologda)
Mezen (near Mezen)
Nautsiyoki
Onega (in Onega)
Kem (in Kem)
Niva (in Kandalaksha)
Malaya Belaya (on the Kola Peninsula in Murmansk Oblast)
Varzuga (in Kuzomen)
Ponoy (in Ponoy)
Iokanga (in Iokanga)
Voronya

Baltic Sea

The rivers in this section are sorted south-west to north-east.
Pregolya (near Kaliningrad)
Alle/Lava (in Znamensk)
Instruch/Inster (in Chernyakhovsk)
Angrapa (in Chernyakhovsk)
Pissa (near Chernyakhovsk)
Krasnaya River (in Gusev)
Nemunas/Neman (near Šilutė, Lithuania)
Šešupė (near Neman)
Daugava/Western Dvina (near Riga, Latvia)
Polota (in Polatsk, Belarus)
Kasplya (in Surazh, Belarus)
Mezha (near Velizh)
Obsha (near Bely)
Narva (near Narva)
Plyussa (near Slantsy)
Lake Peipsi (near Slantsy)
Velikaya (near Pskov)
Kukhva River (near Ostrov)
Luga (in Ust-Luga)
Oredezh (near Luga)
Neva (in Saint Petersburg)
Okhta (in Saint Petersburg)
Okkervil (in Saint Petersburg)
Izhora (in Ust-Izhora)
Tosna (in Otradnoye)
Mga (near Mga)
Lake Ladoga (in Shlisselburg)
Volkhov (near Volkhov)
Tigoda (near Kirishi)
Ravan
Chagoda
Vishera (near Velikiy Novgorod)
Lake Ilmen (in Velikiy Novgorod)
Msta (near Velikiy Novgorod)
Peretna (in Toporok)
Uver (near Berezovsky Ryadok)
Berezayka (in Berezovsky Ryadok)
Valdayka
Lake Mstino (near Vyshny Volochyok)
Tsna (near Vyshny Volochyok)
Pola (near Staraya Russa)
Lovat (near Staraya Russa)
Polist (near Staraya Russa)
Kunya (in Kholm)
Shelon (near Shimsk)
Syas (in Syasstroy)
Svir (near Lodeynoye Pole)
Pasha (near Lodeynoye Pole)
Oyat (near Lodeynoye Pole)
Lake Onega
Suna (in Kondopoga)
Vodla (near Pudozh)
Andoma (north of Vytegra)
Vytegra (near Vytegra)
Vuoksi (in Solovyovo and Priozersk)
Volchya (near Losevo)
Sestra (near Sestroretsk)

Black Sea
The rivers in this section are sorted west to east.
Dnieper (near Kherson, Ukraine)
Desna (near Kyiv, Ukraine)
Seim (in Sosnytsia, Ukraine)
Sudost (north of Novhorod-Siversky, Ukraine)
Vyazma
Mius (into Sea of Azov near Taganrog)
Don (into Sea of Azov near Azov)
Temernik (near Rostov-on-Don)
Manych (in Manychskaya, east of Rostov-on-Don)
Sal (in Semikarakorsk)
Donets (near Semikarakorsk)
Khopyor (near Serafimovich)
Osered' (near Pavlovsk)
Bityug (near Pavlovsk)
Voronezh (near Voronezh)
Yeya (into Sea of Azov near Yeysk)
Kuban (into Sea of Azov near Temryuk)
Laba (in Ust-Labinsk)
Mzymta (near Sochi)

Caspian Sea
The rivers in this section are sorted west to east.
Sulak (north of Makhachkala)
Andi Koysu (near Gimry)
Avar Koysu (near Gimry)
Terek (near Kizlyar)
Malka (near Prokhladny)
Kuma (north of Kizlyar)
Podkumok (near Georgiyevsk)
Volga (near Astrakhan)
Yeruslan (near Kamyshin)
Tereshka (near Saratov)
Bolshoy Irgiz (near Volsk)
Maly Irgiz
Chapayevka (near Chapayevsk)
Samara (in Samara)
Sok (in Samara)
Kondurcha (north of Samara)
Bolshoy Cheremshan (near Dimitrovgrad)
Bezdna
Aktay
Kama (south of Kazan)
Vyatka (near Nizhnekamsk)
Cheptsa (near Kirov)
Belaya (near Neftekamsk)
Ufa (in Ufa)
Yuryuzan (near Karaidel)
Chusovaya (near Perm)
Sylva (near Perm)
Yegoshikha (in Perm)
Mulyanka (in Perm)
Vishera (near Solikamsk)
Kolva (near Cherdyn)
Kazanka (in Kazan)
Sviyaga (west of Kazan)
Ilet (near Volzhsk)
Anish (near Kozlovka)
Malaya Kokshaga (near Kokshaysk)
Maly Kundysh
Bolshaya Kokshaga (near Kokshaysk)
Bolshoy Kundysh
Tsivil (near Novocheboksarsk)
Rutka
Vetluga (near Kozmodemyansk)
Sura (in Vasilsursk)
Pyana
Alatyr (in Alatyr)
Kerzhenets (near Lyskovo)
Kudma (between Kstovo and Lyskovo)
Oka (in Nizhny Novgorod)
Klyazma (in Gorbatov)
Teza (near Yuzha)
Nerl (near Vladimir)
Moksha (near Yelatma)
Tsna (near Sasovo)
Pra (near Kasimov)
Moskva (in Kolomna)
Pakhra (near Moscow)
Neglinnaya (in Moscow)
Yauza (in Moscow)
Setun (in Moscow)
Istra (near Moscow)
Ruza (near Ruza)
Nara (in Serpukhov)
Protva (near Serpukhov)
Luzha (near Maloyaroslavets)
Ugra (near Kaluga)
Upa (near Suvorov)
Plava River (near Krapivna)
Uzola (near Balakhna)
Unzha (in Yuryevets)
Neya (near Makaryev)
Viga
Nyomda (near Yuryevets)
Shuya
Kostroma (in Kostroma)
Vyoksa (in Buy)
Kotorosl (in Yaroslavl)
Sogozha (near Poshekhonye)
Sheksna (in Cherepovets)
Lake Beloye (near Belozersk)
Kovzha
Kema
Suda (near Cherepovets)
Kolp
Mologa (near Vesyegonsk)
Kashinka (near Kalyazin)
Nerl (near Kalyazin)
Kubr
Medveditsa (near Kimry)
Dubna (in Dubna)
Sestra (near Dubna)
Shosha (near Konakovo)
Lama (near Kozlovo)
Tvertsa (in Tver)
Osuga (near Torzhok)
Vazuza (in Zubtsov)
Selizharovka (in Selizharovo)
Ural (in Atyrau, Kazakhstan)
Ilek (in Ilek)
Sakmara (in Orenburg)

Arctic Ocean, east of the Urals
The rivers in this section are sorted west to east.
Ob (to Gulf of Ob)
Synya
Sob
Irtysh (near Khanty-Mansiysk)
Tobol (in Tobolsk)
Tavda (southwest of Tobolsk)
Tura (some 80 km downstream from Tyumen)
Iset (near Yalutorovsk)
Miass (east of Shadrinsk)
Ubagan
Uy (south of Kurgan)
Ishim (in Ust-Ishim)
Tara near (Tara)
Om (in Omsk)
Tromyogan 
Agan
Vatinsky Yogan
Vakh (near Nizhnevartovsk)
Sabun
Tym (in Ust-Tym)
Kievsky Yogan
Vasyugan (in Kargasok)
Parabel (near Kargasok)
Ket (near Kolpashevo)
Chulym (in Ust-Chulym)
Tom (50 km downstream from Tomsk)
Aley (near Barnaul)
Kazym
Chaya
Iksa
Barnaulka
Kasmala
Katun River (in Biysk)
Biya River (in Biysk)
Chulyshman (into Lake Teletskoye)
Bashkaus
Chebdar
Nadym (into Gulf of Ob in Khorovaya)
Pur (into Taz Estuary in Ivay-Sale)
Taz (into Taz Estuary in Tazovsky)
Tolka
Khudosey
Yenisei
Tanama
Turukhan (near Turukhansk)
Abakan (in Abakan)
Kureika River
Yeloguy
Big Kheta
Sym
Lower Tunguska 
Vivi River
Bakhta River
Stony Tunguska
Katanga
Tetere
Big Pit River
Kan River
Mana River
Bazaikha River
Kacha River
Kem River
Khemchik River
Khantayka
Angara River (in Strelka)
Oka (near Bratsk)
Bolshaya Belaya (near Usolye-Sibirskoye)
Irkut (in Irkutsk)
Selenga (into Lake Baikal near Kabansk)
Uda (in Ulan Ude)
Khilok River
Chikoy River
Menza River
Orkhon River
Tuul River
Dzhida River
Eg River (Mongolia)
Barguzin River (into Lake Baikal in Ust-Barguzin)
Turka River (into Lake Baikal)
Upper Angara River (into Lake Baikal near Severobaykalsk)
Churo
Taseyeva River
Chuna River
Kosovka River
Biryusa River
Pyasina (east of Taz Estuary)
Khatanga (near Kozhevnikovo)
Kotuy (near Khatanga)
Kotuykan
Kheta (near Khatanga)
Anabar (at Khorgo)
Suolama
Udya (Udzha)
Malaya Kuonamka
Bolshaya Kuonamka
Uele
Olenyok (in Ust-Olenyok)
Arga-Sala
Kengeede
Kyuyonelekeen
Kukusunda
Kyuyonelikeen
Alakit
Siligir
Merchimden
Ukukit
Birekte
Kuoyka
Beyenchime
Kyuyutingde
Bur
Khorbusuonka
Kelimyar
Buolkalakh
Lena (near Tiksi)
Vilyuy (near Sangar)
Tyung
Ulakhan-Botuobuya
Ochchuguy Botuobuya
Chona
Tyukyan
Markha
Bappagay
Ygyatta
Lungkha
Namana 
Tyugyuene
Sitte
Khanchaly
Kenkeme
Lyapiske
Tympylykan
Belyanka 
Munni
Batamay
Aldan (in Batamay)
Amga (in Ust-Amginskoye)
Maya (in Ust-Maya)
Amedichi
Tyry
Notora
Timpton
Yungyuele
Uchur
Allakh-Yun
Khanda
Tompo
Tatta
Baray
Tukulan
Kele
Tumara
Nuora
Bolshoy Patom
Olyokma
Chara
Tokko
Apsat
Zhuya
Nyukzha
Tungir
Buotama
Menda
Tamma 
Myla
Sinyaya
Matta
Lyutenge
Tuolba
Linde
Suola
Muna
Motorchuna
Molodo
Syungyude
Cherendey (left)
Biryuk (left)
Nyuya (in Nyuya)
Derba
Ura
 Peleduy 
Vitim (in Vitim)
Kalar
Kalakan
Tsipa 
Amalat
Tsipikan
Muya
Konda
Karenga
Mama
Mamakan
Chaya
Ichera
Chechuy 
Pilyuda
Chuya
Kirenga (in Kirensk)
Tayura
Kuta 
Tutura
Ilga
Kyundyudey
Undyulyung (From the Verkhoyansk Range)
Nuora 
Begidyan
Khoruongka
Sobolokh-Mayan
Menkere
Natara
Uel Siktyakh
Dzhardzhan
Byosyuke
Dyanyshka
Eyekit 
Yana (in Nizhneyansk)
Adycha
Derbeke
Nelgese
Tuostakh
Borulakh
Charky
Oldzho
Nenneli
Tykakh
Abyrabyt
Dulgalakh
Sartang
Bytantay
Baky
Chondon
Nuchcha
Buor-Yuryakh
Sellyakh
Omoloy
Kuranakh-Yuryakh
Arga-Yuryakh
Ulakhan-Kyuegyulyur
Kyuyol-Yuryakh
Khroma
Yuryung-Ulakh
Sundrun
Maly Khomus-Yuryakh
Bogdashkina
Volchya
Gusinaya
Indigirka (near Tabor, Sakha)
Khastakh
Shandrin
Kuydusun 
Kyuente
Elgi
Nera 
Moma
Chibagalakh
Badyarikha
Selennyakh
Shangina
Bolshaya Ercha
Druzhina 
Uyandina
Khatyngnakh
Khachimcher  
Buor-Yuryakh
Allaikha
Byoryolyokh
Alazeya
Buor-Yuryakh
Rossokha
Arga-Yuryakh
Kolyma (near Ambarchik)
Anyuy (near Nizhnekolymsk)
Bolshoy Anyuy River
Maly Anyuy River
Omolon (±80 km upstream from Nizhnekolymsk)
Ango
Oloy
Kedon
Namyndykan
Popovka 
Yasachnaya 
Omulyovka 
Zyryanka 
Ozhogina 
Sededema
Buyunda 
Seymchan 
Balygychan 
Sugoy 
Debin
Bakhapcha
Maltan
Taskan
Korkodon 
Bulun
Beryozovka 
Tenka 
Ayan-Yuryakh 
Kulu
Chaun River
Palyavaam River
Pegtymel River (flowing into Chukchi Sea)
Amguema River
Ioniveyem River
Chegitun River

Pacific Ocean/Sea of Okhotsk
The rivers in this section are sorted north to south.
Anadyr (in the Bering Sea)
Tanyurer
Belaya (Chukotka)
Yablon
Yeropol
Mayn
Velikaya
Khatyrka
Iomrautvaam
Ukelayat
Paren
Ola
Arman
Khasyn
Yama
Yana
Taui
Chyolomdzha
Inya
Ulbeya
Kukhtuy
Okhota
Gizhiga
Penzhina
Belaya (Penzhina)
Oklan
Kamchatka (in Ust-Kamchatsk)
Avacha (near Petropavlovsk-Kamchatsky)
Bolshaya (west coast of Kamchatka Peninsula)
Kikhchik (west coast of Kamchatka Peninsula)
Uda (in Chumikan)
Maya
Amur (in Nikolayevsk-on-Amur)
Anyuy (in Naykhin)
Ussuri (in Khabarovsk)
Bikin River (near Bikin)
Kontrovod (near Luchegorsk)
Gur
Gorin
Bureya (near Raychikhinsk)
Zeya (in Blagoveshchensk)
Tom (±80 km upstream from Blagoveshchensk)
Selemdzha (±50 km upstream from Svobodny)
Nora
Ulma
Orlovka
Byssa
Dep
Shilka
Nercha (near Nerchinsk)
Ingoda (near Shilka)
Onon (near Shilka)
Amgun
Nimelen
Argun
Amazar
Tumen (in Sŏsura-ri, North Korea)

Endorheic Siberian rivers
Bagan (river)
Burla (river)
Chulym (Lake Malye Chany)
Karasuk (river)
Kargat (river)
Kuchuk (river)
Kulunda (river)

Unsorted
Chernaya River(into Kamenka River (Saint Petersburg))
Kosovoy
Tuloma River
Rosta River

Alphabetical list

A–G
Abakan, Alazeya, Aldan, Aley, Ambarnaya, Amga, Amur, Anabar, Anadyr, Angara River, Angrapa, Anyuy (Kolyma), Anyuy (Amur), Argun, Avacha, Barguzin, Bashkaus, Belaya, Berezayka, Bikin, Bityug, Biya, Bolshaya Belaya, Bolshaya Pyora (Amur Oblast), Bolshaya Pyora (Komi Republic), Buotama, Bureya, Chagoda, Chebdar, Cheptsa, Chernaya, Chulym (Ob), Chulyshman, Chusovaya, Cupid, Daugava/Western Dvina, Dep, Desna, Dnieper, Don, (Seversky) Donets, Dubna, El'duga

I–L
Ik, Ilek, Indigirka, Ingoda, Instruch, Iokanga, Irkut, Irtysh, Iset, Ishim, Istra, Izhora, Kama, Kamo River (Russia), Kamchatka, Kashinka, Kasplya, Katanga, Katun, Kazanka, Kerzhenets, Ket, Khatanga, Kheta, Khopyor, Kirenga, Klyazma, Kolva (Usa), Kolva (Vishera), Kolyma, Kondurcha, Kosovka, Kosovoy, Kostroma, Kotorosl, Kotuy, Kozhim, Krasnaya River, Kuban, Kubr, Kuma, Kunya, Laba, Lama, Lava/Łyna, Lena, Lovat, Lower Tunguska, Luga, Lyutenge

M–S
Malka, Malaya Belaya, Manych, Markha, Markha (Vilyuy), Matta, Maya, Mezen, Mga, Miass, Mius, Moksha, Mologa, Moskva, Msta, Mulyanka, Muna, Nadym, Nara, Narva, Nautsiyoki River, Neglinnaya, Nemunas/Neman, Nercha, Nerl (Klyazma), Nerl (Volga), Neva, Niva, Northern Dvina, Nyuya, Ob, Oka (Volga), Oka (Angara River), Olenyok, Olyokma, Om, Omolon, Onega, Onon, Oredezh, Osuga, Oyat, Pakhra, Pasha, Parabel, Pechora, Pinega, Pissa, Plava, Podkamennaya Tunguska, Podkumok, Pola, Polist, Polota, Ponoy, Pra, Pregolya, Protva, Pur, Pyasina, Ravan, Ruza, Sakmara, Sal, Samara, Seim, Selemdzha, Selenga, Sestra River (Leningrad Oblast), Sestra River (Dubna), Šešupė, Setun, Sheksna, Shelon, Shilka, Shosha, Sudost, Sukhona, Suola, Sura, Svir, Sviyaga, Syas, Sylva

T–Z
Tavda, Tara, Taz, Terek, Tetere, Teza, Tigoda, Tobol, Tom (Ob), Tom (Zeya), Tosna, Tsna River (Moksha basin), Tsna River (Tver Oblast), Tugur, Tumen, Tura, Turukhan, Tvertsa, Tym, Tyung, Uda (Buryatia), Uda (Khabarovsk Krai), Ufa, Uftyuga, Ugra, Unzha, Upa, Upper Angara River, Ural, Usa, Ussuri, Uver, Uzola, Vaga, Vakh, Valdayka, Varzuga, Vasyugan, Velikaya, Vetluga, Vilyuy, Vishera (Volkhov), Vishera (Vychegda), Vishera (Kama), Vitim, Volchya (Vuoksi), Volga, Volkhov, Vologda, Voronezh, Voronya, Vuoksi, Vyatka, Vyazma, Vychegda, Vytegra, Yana, Yauza, Yegoshikha, Yomtsa, Yenisei, Yug, Yuryuzan, Zeya, Zhupanova

References 

 
Russia
Rivers